Salem is an American television series loosely based on the historic Salem Witch Trials created by Brannon Braga and Adam Simon. In the United States, it premiered on WGN America on April 20, 2014 as the network's first original scripted series. Salem follows the lives of a community in Salem, Massachusetts in the 17th century during the infamous Witch Trials, only this time it's the witches that are controlling them for their own wicked purposes. Mary Sibley (Janet Montgomery) leads a secret coven of witches, including Tituba (Ashley Madekwe) to turn the Puritans against one another to perform the Grand Rite, but things get complicated when Mary's lost love, John Alden (Shane West) returns to Salem, and Cotton Mather (Seth Gabel) closes in on the witches. On July 11, 2015, WGN America renewed Salem for a 10-episode third season which premiered on November 2, 2016. On December 13, 2016, it was announced that WGN had cancelled the show after three seasons.

Series overview

Episodes

Season 1 (2014)

Season 2 (2015)

Season 3 (2016–17)

References

External links

Salem